Arengo and Freedom (AL) was a liberal and social liberal political party in San Marino.

It was founded in September 2008 by two splinters from the Party of Socialists and Democrats, Fabio Berardi and Nadia Ottaviani, both members of the Grand and General Council, who considered the party to be too leftist. The group is linked to the Italian Clubs of Freedom. For the 2008 general election, the sole elections Arengo and Freedom have competed in, the party was part of the Pact for San Marino coalition and had its candidates in the list of the Sammarinese Christian Democratic Party (PDCS). The electoral coalition won 35 seats out of 60 in the Grand and General Council in the Sammarinese parliamentary election, 2008 gaining 54.22% of the national vote and a governmental majority of 5.

After the Sammarinese political crisis of 2011, and looking to the elections of 2012, the party collapsed, their members joining many different parties.

References

Defunct political parties in San Marino
Liberal parties in San Marino
2008 establishments in San Marino
2012 disestablishments in San Marino
Political parties established in 2008
Political parties disestablished in 2012